Glulx is a 32-bit portable virtual machine intended for writing and playing interactive fiction. It was designed by Andrew Plotkin to relieve some of the restrictions in the venerable Z-machine format. For example, the Z-machine provides native support for 16-bit integers, while Glulx natively supports 32-bit integers.

Versions and popularity
The Inform compiler, starting with version 6.30, can produce either Z-machine or Glulx story files. A Spanish interactive fiction development system called Superglús also uses Glulx.

Despite being a better-adapted virtual machine for modern computing hardware and being just as accessible to developers, Glulx continues to lag behind the Z-machine in popularity, largely due to the comparative rarity of interpreters. The most popular interpreter for Glulx is Andrew Plotkin's Glulxe. Glulxe uses the Glk API for input and output.

File and email extensions
The MIME type for Glulx is "application/x-glulx".
Glulx files have the file extension .ulx, but they are commonly archived in Blorb packages. For Blorb packages containing a Glulx work, accepted file extensions are .gblorb, .glb, .blorb and .blb. The former two extensions are intended to make it easy for interpreters to figure out which type of game is inside the Blorb file.

References

External links
 The Glulx specification
 Glulx games at "Baf's Guide"
 Interpreters that can run Glulx games

Text adventure game engines
Virtual machines